Papowo Toruńskie  (German: Thornisch Papau) is a village in the administrative district of Gmina Łysomice, within Toruń County, Kuyavian-Pomeranian Voivodeship, in north-central Poland.

The village has a population of 1,100.

References

Villages in Toruń County